Amor Secreto is the third studio album recorded by Puerto Rican-American singer-songwriter Luis Fonsi. It was released by Universal Music Latino on 12 March 2002 (see 2002 in music).

Track listing 

 MMII. Universal Music Latino.

Credits and personnel 

 Johan Åberg – producer
 Vincent Becchinelli – design
 Dow Brain – producer
 Ron Cadiz – photography
 Vinnie Colaiuta – bateria
 Tulio Cremisini – producer
 Kara DioGuardi – producer
 Rafael Ferro García – arranger
 Luis Fonsi – coros, executive producer, producer
 Jon Gass – mezcla
 Julio Hernández – bajo sexto
 David Irvin – art direction
 Ted Jensen – mastering
 Sebastian Krys – mezcla
 Michael Landau – guitar
 Lee Levin – bateria
 Iris Martínez – coros
 Harvey Mason Jr. – producer
 Carlos Mendoza – coros
 Steve Morales – didjeridu, producer
 Joel Numa – engineer
 Mario Patiño – producer
 Dave Pensado – mezcla
 Betsy Pérez – production coordination
 Rudy Pérez – arranger, coros, dirigida, guitar, keyboards, percussion, producer, programming
 Clay Perry – keyboards, programming
 Mark Portmann – arranger, keyboards, programming
 Jonas Saeed – producer
 Milton Sesenton – arranger, piano
 Simon Simantob – guitar
 Neil Stubenhaus – bajo sexto
 Steve Sykes – engineer
 Michael Hart Thompson – guitar
 Felipe Tichauer – engineer
 Ronnie Torres – engineer, mezcla
 Tommy Tysper – producer
 Anders Von Hofsten – coros
 Dan Warner – guitar
 Bruce Weeden – engineer
 Brad Young – producer

Charts

Sales and certifications

References 

2002 albums
Luis Fonsi albums
Spanish-language albums
Universal Music Latino albums
Albums produced by Rudy Pérez